The 2016 Backlash was the 12th Backlash professional wrestling pay-per-view and livestreaming event produced by WWE. It was held exclusively for wrestlers from the promotion's SmackDown brand division. The event took place on September 11, 2016, at the Richmond Coliseum in Richmond, Virginia. It was the first Backlash held since the 2009 event, subsequently making it the first to air on WWE's online streaming service, the WWE Network, which launched in 2014, and it was the only Backlash to be held in September. Following the reintroduction of the brand extension in July 2016, Backlash was the first brand-exclusive PPV of the second brand split and was the first brand-exclusive PPV held since No Way Out in 2007. The original concept of Backlash was based on the backlash of WrestleMania, however, the 2016 event dropped this theme as it was instead held after that year's SummerSlam—the post-WrestleMania theme would return with the 2021 event.

Seven professional wrestling matches were scheduled on the event's card, and an additional one on the Kickoff pre-show.
In the main event, AJ Styles defeated Dean Ambrose to win the WWE World Championship, making him the first wrestler since Kurt Angle to hold world championships in WWE, Total Nonstop Action Wrestling (now Impact Wrestling), and New Japan Pro-Wrestling. The event also determined the inaugural champions for SmackDown's women's and tag team divisions, which were won by Becky Lynch and the team of Heath Slater and Rhyno, respectively. 

Unlike a large majority of WWE pay-per-view events, the 2016 Backlash did not see a DVD or Blu Ray release.

Production

Background
Backlash is a pay-per-view (PPV) event that was established by WWE in 1999. It was held annually from 1999 to 2009, however, in 2010, Backlash was discontinued and replaced by Extreme Rules—in April 2011, the promotion ceased going by its full name of World Wrestling Entertainment, with "WWE" becoming an orphaned initialism. In August 2011, WWE ended the first brand extension, but in mid-2016, the brand split was revived and the roster was again divided between the Raw and SmackDown brands where the wrestlers were exclusively assigned to perform. WWE also brought back brand-exclusive PPVs, and due to the need for more PPV events, Backlash was reinstated to be held exclusively for the SmackDown brand. As a result, it was WWE's first brand-exclusive PPV of the second brand split and was the 12th event in the Backlash chronology.

The original concept of the pay-per-view was based around the backlash from WWE's flagship event, WrestleMania. The 2016 Backlash, however, was scheduled to be held on September 11, 2016, at the Richmond Coliseum in Richmond, Virginia, thus ending its previous tradition of being the post-WrestleMania PPV. The event was instead held after SummerSlam that year. It was the first and so far only Backlash to be held in September. In addition to traditional PPV, the event also aired on the WWE Network, which is WWE's online streaming service that launched in February 2014.

Storylines
The card included eight matches, including one on the Kickoff pre-show, that resulted from scripted storylines, where wrestlers portrayed villains, heroes, or less distinguishable characters in scripted events that built tension and culminated in a wrestling match or series of matches, with results predetermined by WWE's writers on the SmackDown brand. Storylines were produced on WWE's weekly television show SmackDown Live.

At SummerSlam, Dean Ambrose retained the WWE World Championship against Dolph Ziggler, while AJ Styles defeated John Cena. On the following SmackDown, Styles taunted Ziggler about his loss, provoking him to attack Styles. Later, Styles was declared the no. 1 contender for the WWE World Championship at Backlash, which prompted Ziggler to come out to demand a shot at the title. Styles would defeat Ziggler in the main event of the August 23 episode of SmackDown Live, to prevent the title match from being turned into a triple threat match involving Ziggler. On the August 30 episode, a non-title match between Ambrose and Baron Corbin ended in disqualification when Styles, who was providing guest commentary for the match, interfered to attack Ambrose. An ensuing three-way brawl culminated in Styles straddling the top rope. A week later, Ambrose mocked Styles' end to the previous week's show, causing a confrontation between himself and Styles, leading Styles to hit Ambrose with a low blow.

At the 2016 WWE draft, WWE Women's Champion Charlotte was drafted to Raw, leaving SmackDown without a women's championship. On the August 23 episode of SmackDown Live, the WWE SmackDown Women's Championship was unveiled, and a six-pack elimination challenge between Alexa Bliss, Becky Lynch, Carmella, Naomi, Natalya, and Nikki Bella was slated for Backlash to crown the inaugural champion. Bella had returned from injury two nights before at SummerSlam, when she had joined Natalya and Alexa Bliss to replace the suspended Eva Marie in a winning effort against Becky Lynch, Carmella, and Naomi. Nikki was set to face Carmella following the unveiling of the title, whom she had pinned at SummerSlam. Instead, however, Carmella turned villainous by attacking Nikki during a pre-match interview and again during Talking Smack, SmackDown's aftershow. On the following episode of SmackDown Live, the evil Carmella once again attacked Nikki, who provided guest commentary on a tag team match taking place between her other Backlash opponents. On the September 6 episode, the six women had a championship forum conducted by general manager Daniel Bryan, which ended in a brawl, causing a six-woman tag team match to be announced, with the team of Nikki Bella, Becky Lynch, and Naomi facing Natalya, Alexa Bliss, and Carmella. The match ended with Carmella making Nikki submit to the Code of Silence.

Also at the 2016 draft, WWE Tag Team Champions The New Day were drafted to Raw, which also left the SmackDown brand without tag team championships. On the August 23 episode of SmackDown Live, the WWE SmackDown Tag Team Championship was unveiled, and a tournament to crown the inaugural champions was then set up, with the tournament's final scheduled for Backlash. Originally scheduled to be a six-team tournament between American Alpha, The Ascension, Breezango, The Hype Bros, The Usos, and The Vaudevillains, Heath Slater, who was still trying to earn a SmackDown contract after being left out of the WWE draft, was granted entry into the tournament on the condition that he must find a partner and win the tournament to earn a contract. Rhyno, who had defeated Slater to win a contract weeks before, agreed to be his partner. In the quarter-finals, The Usos and American Alpha advanced with wins over The Ascension and Breezango, respectively. The following week, The Hype Bros, as well as Slater and Rhyno, would later advance with wins over The Vaudevillains and The Headbangers (who were added to the tournament), respectively. On the September 6 episode, American Alpha and the team of Slater and Rhyno advanced with wins over The Usos and The Hype Bros, respectively. However, The Usos would attack American Alpha after their match, causing Chad Gable to suffer a leg injury. Due to this, American Alpha were ruled out of the tournament final, and a match between The Usos and The Hype Bros was then set for Backlash, with the winners replacing American Alpha in the final against Slater and Rhyno.

On the August 23 episode of SmackDown, Bray Wyatt confronted Randy Orton. The following week, Wyatt challenged Orton to a match at Backlash, which Orton accepted. On the September 6 episode, Wyatt stated that Orton had become weak following his showing at SummerSlam, and would be the one to initiate change in Orton. Orton would later respond to Wyatt, mocking his messages, prompting a match between the two to be commissioned for Backlash.

On the August 23 edition of Talking Smack, Intercontinental Champion The Miz went on a tirade on general manager Daniel Bryan, in response to Bryan's comments about him wrestling "like a coward" and "someone who's afraid to get hit". On the following week's episode of SmackDown, Dolph Ziggler confronted The Miz, agreeing with Bryan to goad The Miz into a match for the Intercontinental Championship. After also insulting The Miz for being "a soft, safe coward", Bryan scheduled The Miz to defend his Intercontinental Championship against Ziggler at Backlash. On the September 6 episode of SmackDown, The Miz slapped Ziggler, who was providing guest commentary for The Miz's match against Apollo Crews, before fleeing.

Event

Pre-show
During the Backlash Kickoff pre-show, Baron Corbin faced Apollo Crews. The end came when Corbin executed the "End of Days" on Crews to win the match.

Preliminary matches
The pay-per-view's main card opened with the six-pack elimination challenge to determine the inaugural SmackDown Women's Champion involving Becky Lynch, Alexa Bliss, Carmella, Naomi, Natalya, and Nikki Bella. Bliss was eliminated by Naomi after a Diving Neckbreaker/Powerbomb combination with Natalya. Natalya then eliminated Naomi by forcing her to submit to the "Sharpshooter". Nikki eliminated Natalya after a "Rack Attack 2.0", but was immediately eliminated by Carmella with a roll-up. Lynch forced Carmella to submit to the "Dis-arm-her" to win the title.

Next, The Usos (Jey and Jimmy Uso) faced The Hype Bros (Mojo Rawley and Zack Ryder) to qualify for the finals of the SmackDown Tag Team Championship tournament. In the end, Jimmy forced Ryder to submit to the "Tequila Sunrise" to win the match and qualify for the tournament final against Heath Slater and Rhyno.

After that, The Miz defended the Intercontinental Championship against Dolph Ziggler. During the match, Miz applied the "Figure Four Leglock", but Ziggler touched the rope. Ziggler executed a Superkick on Miz, who placed his foot on the rope at a two count. Whilst Miz distracted the referee, Maryse sprayed an unknown object at Ziggler, allowing Miz to execute a "Skull Crushing Finale" on Ziggler to retain the title.

Randy Orton was scheduled to face Bray Wyatt, but Wyatt had attacked him earlier in the event. Orton was then rendered unable to compete, and Wyatt was declared the winner via forfeit. Instead, Wyatt faced Kane in a No Holds Barred match, to substitute for Orton. During the match, Wyatt executed a Running Senton through a broadcast table on Kane. Kane executed a Chokeslam on Wyatt for a near-fall. In the end, Orton interfered and attacked Wyatt with an "RKO", leading to Kane executing a second Chokeslam on Wyatt to win the match.

Later, Heath Slater and Rhyno faced The Usos to determine the inaugural SmackDown Tag Team Champions. Rhyno executed a Gore on Jimmy whilst the referee was distracted, with Slater gaining the pinfall, to win the titles.

Main event
In the main event, Dean Ambrose defended the WWE World Championship against AJ Styles. During the match, Styles applied the "Calf Crusher" on Ambrose but Ambrose touched the ropes. Styles re-applied the "Calf Crusher", but Ambrose escaped. Styles executed a "Springboard 450 Splash" on Ambrose for a near-fall. Ambrose threw Styles over the barricade and dove onto him off a broadcast table. In the end, Ambrose attempted "Dirty Deeds", but Styles pushed Ambrose into Mike Chioda, the referee. Styles attacked Ambrose with a low blow and executed a "Styles Clash", to win the title.

Aftermath 
On September 13 episode of SmackDown Live, while AJ Styles was addressing the crowd of his title victory at the event, John Cena returned to challenge Styles to a match for the WWE World Championship, in an attempt to become a 16 time world champion. Dean Ambrose then appeared, demanding to have his rematch clause granted first. SmackDown commissioner Shane McMahon would then announce that Styles would defend his title against Cena and Ambrose in a triple threat match at No Mercy.

Having become one-half of the inaugural SmackDown Tag Team Champions at the event, Heath Slater was granted his SmackDown contract that was signed on the September 13 episode of SmackDown Live. This rendered him exclusive to the SmackDown brand, and was where Slater and Rhyno would be successful in their first titles defense against The Ascension. The Usos would defeat American Alpha later on to earn a rematch against Slater and Rhyno for the titles at No Mercy.

Following his successful Intercontinental Championship defense against Dolph Ziggler, The Miz continued to berate general manager Daniel Bryan, and would vow not to defend his Intercontinental Championship on any show until he is granted a contract renegotiation. Bryan would later acquiesce to a contract renegotiation, while Ziggler would lose on back to back weeks against The Miz for the title. Ziggler would later put his career on the line for another chance at the title, at No Mercy.

Alexa Bliss was later crowned the no. 1 contender for the SmackDown Women's Championship after beating four other competitors on the following episode of SmackDown Live. The championship match was scheduled for No Mercy.

The Wrestling Observer Newsletter would report that Randy Orton was not cleared to wrestle at Backlash due to a concussion suffered from his main event match against Brock Lesnar that occurred the previous month at SummerSlam. On September 24, 2016, at a house show in Chicago, Illinois, Lesnar defeated Orton in a no disqualification rematch. Orton would later return to SmackDown in order to challenge Wyatt to a rematch at No Mercy, which Wyatt accepted.

Results

SmackDown Tag Team Championship tournament bracket 
† When Chad Gable suffered an injury after defeating The Usos, American Alpha were removed from the final. The Usos then defeated The Hype Bros at Backlash in a second chance tag team match to replace American Alpha in the final.

SmackDown Women's Championship match

References

External links 
 

2016 in professional wrestling
2016
2016 WWE Network events
2016 in Virginia
Professional wrestling in Richmond, Virginia
2016 WWE pay-per-view events
September 2016 events in the United States
WWE SmackDown